George Richard Hodges Nugent, Baron Nugent of Guildford,  (6 June 1907 – 16 March 1994), known as Sir Richard Nugent, 1st Baronet between 1960 and 1966, was a British Conservative politician.

Background
Nugent was the son of Colonel George Roubiliac Hodges Nugent and his wife Violet Stella, daughter of Henry Theopphilus Sheppard. He was educated at the Imperial Service College and went then to the Royal Military Academy, Woolwich.

Career
In 1926, Nugent was commissioned into the Royal Artillery, leaving it after three years. He joined the County Council for Surrey in 1944 and became an alderman in 1951, representing the county later as a Justice of the Peace. Nugent entered the British House of Commons in 1950, sitting as a Member of Parliament (MP) for Guildford until 1966. He became Parliamentary Secretary to the Ministry of Agriculture and Fisheries in 1951, an office he held until 1957. Subsequently, he served as Parliamentary Secretary to the Ministry of Transport until October 1959. Nugent was created a Baronet, of Dunsfold in the County of Surrey, on 27 January 1960 and was sworn of the Privy Council in 1962. He received a life peerage with the title Baron Nugent of Guildford, of Dunsfold in the County of Surrey on 31 May 1966.

In 1944, Nugent became a member of the National Farmers Union's executive council and in 1948 a vice-chairman of the National Federation of Young Farmers' Clubs, occupying both posts until 1951. He chaired the Thames Conservancy Board for fourteen years from 1960 and was nominated a Fellow of the Royal Society of Arts in 1962. Two years later, he became chairman of the Animal Virus Research Institute until 1977. Nugent became the first chairman of the National Water Council in 1973, resigning after five years. He was president of the Royal Society for the Prevention of Accidents (RoSPA) and in 1981 he succeeded in introducing seat belt legislation through an amendment to the Transport Bill.

Family

On 29 July 1937, Nugent married Ruth Stafford, daughter of Hugh Granville Stafford. He and his wife were both awarded honorary doctorates by the University of Surrey in December 1968. Nugent died at Dunsfold in 1994.

Arms

References

External links

1907 births
1994 deaths
People educated at the Imperial Services College
Graduates of the Royal Military Academy, Woolwich
Baronets in the Baronetage of the United Kingdom
Nugent of Guildford
Conservative Party (UK) MPs for English constituencies
Presidents of Surrey County Cricket Club
Stewards of Henley Royal Regatta
UK MPs 1950–1951
UK MPs 1951–1955
UK MPs 1955–1959
UK MPs 1959–1964
UK MPs 1964–1966
UK MPs who were granted peerages
Politics of Guildford
Members of the Privy Council of the United Kingdom
English justices of the peace
Ministers in the third Churchill government, 1951–1955
Ministers in the Eden government, 1955–1957
Ministers in the Macmillan and Douglas-Home governments, 1957–1964
Members of the Parliament of the United Kingdom for Guildford
Royal Artillery officers
20th-century British Army personnel
Life peers created by Elizabeth II